Madison, New York may refer to:

Madison County, New York
Madison (town), New York, located in Madison County
Madison (village), New York, located within the Town of Madison

See also
Madison Avenue, a north–south avenue in the borough of Manhattan
Madison Square
Madison Square Garden